Carnival Lady is a 1933 American drama film directed by Howard Higgin and starring Boots Mallory, Allen Vincent and Donald Kerr.

The film's sets were designed by the art director Lewis J. Rachmil.

Cast
 Boots Mallory as Penny Lee 
 Allen Vincent as Tom Warren 
 Donald Kerr as Dick 
 Rollo Lloyd as Harry 
 Jason Robards Sr. as Jim Ryan 
 Gertrude Astor as Zandra, Fortune Teller 
 Anita Faye as Trixie 
 Richard Hayes as P.T. 'Porky' Owens 
 Earl McDonald as Carl 
 Kit Guard as Gorilla Watson

References

Bibliography
 Michael R. Pitts. Poverty Row Studios, 1929–1940: An Illustrated History of 55 Independent Film Companies, with a Filmography for Each. McFarland & Company, 2005.

External links
 

1933 films
1933 drama films
American drama films
Films directed by Howard Higgin
1930s English-language films
1930s American films